Cracker Island is the eighth studio album by the British virtual band Gorillaz. It was released on 24 February 2023 via Parlophone and Warner Records. It features collaborations with Stevie Nicks, Adeleye Omotayo, Thundercat, Tame Impala, Bad Bunny, Bootie Brown, Beck and MC Bin Laden. Cracker Island received mostly positive reviews, and became the first Gorillaz album to reach number one on the UK Albums Chart since Demon Days (2005). A deluxe edition was released on 27 February with five additional tracks featuring such artists as De La Soul and Dawn Penn.

Background 
The majority of the work on the album began in 2021. "Tormenta", a song made in collaboration with Bad Bunny, was the first completed. It was originally intended to be the lead single for the second season of the web series Song Machine, before the project was shelved in favour of a traditional studio album (as was "New Gold", which would become the album's second single). According to Damon Albarn, permanent collaborator for Gorillaz, the new album was already completed in May of 2022. American record producer, multi-instrumentalist and songwriter Greg Kurstin served as the main producer for the record, alongside British music producer Remi Kabaka Jr. The song "Baby Queen" was inspired by a 1997 meeting that Albarn had with Princess Siribha Chudabhorn at a Blur concert in Bangkok.

Promotion 
Six singles were released from the album. Gorillaz released the first single "Cracker Island" (featuring bassist Thundercat) on 22 June 2022. Along with the release of the single, Gorillaz announced that the band would be following up the Meanwhile EP with a full new album. The name was announced as Cracker Island, with its release date, artwork and tracklist being revealed on 31 August, alongside the release of the second single, "New Gold", (featuring Tame Impala and Bootie Brown). The third single, "Baby Queen", was released on the FIFA 23 soundtrack on 30 September, after being leaked earlier that month. It was later officially released as a single on 4 November. The fourth single, "Skinny Ape", was released on 8 December, alongside the announcement of two virtual shows in Times Square and Piccadilly Circus on 17 and 18 December, respectively. The fifth single, "Silent Running" (featuring Adeleye Omotayo) was released on 27 January 2023, with a music video released on 8 February.

A deluxe edition of the album was released on 27 February featuring an aditional five tracks: "Captain Chicken" featuring Del the Funky Homosapien, "Controllah" featuring MC Bin Laden, "Crocadillaz" featuring De La Soul (with the late Trugoy the Dove) and Dawn Penn, a 2D Piano Version of "Silent Running" featuring Adeleye Omotayo, and a Dom Dolla remix of "New Gold" featuring Tame Impala and Bootie Brown.

Critical reception 

Cracker Island received generally positive reviews from critics upon its release. On Metacritic, which assigns a normalised rating out of 100 to reviews from professional publications, the release received an average score of 80, based on 23 reviews, indicating generally favourable reviews. Aggregator AnyDecentMusic? gave the album a 7.1 out of 10, based on their assessment of the critical consensus.

Reviewing the album for AllMusic, Stephen Thomas Erlewine called it "less an exploration of new sonic territory so much as it is a reaffirmation of his strengths" and felt that "there's a clean, efficient energy propelling Cracker Island that gives the album a fresh pulse." Writing for Clash, Emma Harrison claimed hat, "this ten track album from Gorillaz is more akin to a sprint as opposed to a marathon on the virtual virtuosos’ eighth studio album," and felt that, "despite its diminutive length, ‘Cracker Island’ packs one hell of a punch and spans genres far and wide." In DIY, Lisa Wright declared the album "very much a set piece that prioritises concept and narrative, resulting in one of Gorillaz's most restrained, contemplative releases yet - one that will perhaps appeal to fans of Albarn's solo work more than devotees of his monkeys' more genre-hopping forays."

In a more mixed assessment from Pitchfork, Ben Cardew said the album "walks a very thin line between playing to the band's strengths and relying too heavily on old tricks". Paul Attard was also critical in the review for Slant Magazine: "When left to his own devices (and stripped of his usual slew of Tumblr-approved guests), Albarn engineers some of Cracker Islands most stand-out material, albeit ones that still vary greatly in quality. Songs like the Greg Kurstin-produced 'Tarantula' and 'Skinny Ape,' while still containing some unnecessary passages (most conspicuously the latter's ska breakdown), are comparatively barebones and cleanly produced. Even better is 'Baby Queen,' a gorgeous piece of dream-pop that cuts back on Albarn's worst theatrical tendencies."

Track listing 

 On vinyl releases, "Tarantula" is placed as the fourth track, between "The Tired Influencer" and "Silent Running".

Personnel 
Credits adapted from the liner notes.

Musicians
 Damon Albarn – vocals , synthesisers , electric guitar , piano , bass, keyboards , acoustic guitar , Mellotron 
 Greg Kurstin – keyboards , synthesisers , drums , percussion , bass , electric guitars , piano , marimba , guitars , vibraphone , congas , Mellotron, acoustic guitar, pump organ 
 Thundercat – vocals, bass 
 Stevie Nicks – vocals 
 Adeleye Omotayo – vocals 
 Tame Impala – vocals, synthesisers, bass, guitar, drums, Wurlitzer 
 Bootie Brown – vocals 
 Bad Bunny – vocals, keyboards, percussion 
 Remi Kabaka Jr. – drum programming, percussion 
 Tainy – drum programming 
 Beck – vocals 

Technical
 Damon Albarn – production
 Greg Kurstin – engineering , production 
 Remi Kabaka Jr. – production 
 Kevin Parker – production, engineering 
 Tainy – production 
 Samuel Egglenton – engineering
 Julian Burg – engineering
 Matt Tuggle – engineering
 Henri Davies – engineering 
 Joel Workman – engineering 
 David Reitzas – engineering 
 Federico Fogolia – engineering 
 Tim Visser – engineering 
 Mark "Spike" Stent – mixing
 Matt Wolach – mixing assistance
 Stephen Sedgwick – mixing assistance 
 Randy Merrill – mastering

Artwork
 Jamie Hewlett – artwork, design
 Stars Redmond – assistance

Charts

References 

2023 albums
Gorillaz albums
Parlophone albums
Albums recorded at Studio 13
Warner Records albums
Albums produced by Damon Albarn
Albums produced by Greg Kurstin
Albums produced by Kevin Parker
Albums produced by Tainy